The 2019 National Football League, known for sponsorship reasons as the Allianz National Football League, was the 88th staging of the National Football League (NFL), an annual Gaelic football tournament for Gaelic Athletic Association county teams. Thirty-one county teams from the island of Ireland, plus London, competed; Kilkenny do not participate.

The GAA announced a new broadcast agreement on 10 January 2019, expected to run from 2019 until 2022. Eir Sport and RTÉ provided live TV coverage of the league on Saturday nights. TG4 broadcast Sunday afternoon games. The highlights programmes were RTÉ2's League Sunday on Sunday evenings, TG4's GAA 2019 on Monday evenings and Eir Sport's Allianz Leagues Reloaded on Wednesday evenings.

Mayo were the winners, defeating Kerry in the final.

Experimental rules
On 24 November 2018, the GAA Central Council approved five experimental changes to the football playing rules which were amended slightly and trialled in the 2018–19 early season competitions organised by the four provincial councils (FBD League - Connacht, O'Byrne Cup - Leinster, McGrath Cup - Munster and McKenna Cup - Ulster).

The rules trialled were –
 The maximum number of consecutive handpasses allowed is three.
 A sideline free must be kicked forward except when it is inside the opposing team's 20 metre line.
 An advanced mark (sometimes also referred to as an attacking mark, inside mark or offensive mark) may be taken where the ball is kicked in the area outside the opposing team's 45 metre line, travels more than 20 metres, and is caught cleanly without touching the ground in the area inside the opposing team's 45 metre line by an attacker or a defender. Up to fifteen seconds are allowed for the free resulting from the mark to be taken.
 Ten minutes in a sin bin without replacement is imposed on a player who commits a black card offence. The offending player can re-enter the game or be substituted after the ten minutes have elapsed.
 Kickouts must be taken from the 20 metre line but are not required to travel beyond the 45 metre line.

The effectiveness of the new rules was reviewed by Central Council on 19 January 2019. Although one of the key aims of the experiment was to reduce the number of handpasses in Gaelic football, they voted 25-23 to not continue with the rule that restricted the number of consecutive handpasses to three (which was previously trialled in the 1989 National Football League and quickly abandoned). This decision followed an almost universal campaign by GAA county team managers in the media against its permanent introduction The Gaelic Players Association (GPA) were also strongly against the three handpass rule.

Experimental rules 2 to 5 (see above) were trialled in the 2019 National Football League, beginning on 26 January 2019 and ending on 31 March 2019. There was little criticism of the four rules in the league games though Jim Gavin, the Dublin manager, said the decision to experiment in the league, the GAA's second tier inter-county competition, was "disrespectful".

GAA rules only allow changes to the playing rules in years divisible by five which means that, at the earliest, the experimental playing rules could only be approved by Congress 2020 for implementation in the 2020 Championship.

A Special Congress was held on 19 October 2019. Three rules were passed and were introduced beginning in 2020 –
 The Advanced Mark (passed by 68.9%)
 The Sin Bin (passed by 73.8%)
 Kick-outs from the centre of the 20m line (passed by 83.1%)

Competition format

League structure
The 2019 National Football League consists of four divisions of eight teams. Each team plays every other team in its division once, usually four home and three away or three home and four away. Two points are awarded for a win and one point for a draw.

Tie-breaker
If only two teams are level on league points -
 The team that won the head-to-head match is ranked first
 If this game was a draw, score difference (total scored minus total conceded in all games) is used to rank the teams
 If score difference is identical, total scored is used to rank the teams
 If still identical, a play-off is required
If three or more teams are level on league points, score difference is used to rank the teams.

Finals, promotions and relegations

Division 1
The top two teams in Division 1 contest the National Football League final. The bottom two teams are relegated to Division 2.

Division 2, Division 3 & Division 4
The top two teams in Divisions 2, 3 and 4 are promoted and contest the finals of their respective divisions. The bottom two teams in Divisions 2 and 3 are relegated.

Division 1

Division 1 table

Division 1 Rounds 1 to 7

Division 1 Round 1

Division 1 Round 2

Division 1 Round 3

Division 1 Round 4

Division 1 Round 5

Division 1 Round 6

Division 1 Round 7

Division 1 Final

Division 2

Division 2 table

Division 2 Rounds 1 to 7

Division 2 Round 1

Division 2 Round 2

Division 2 Round 3

Division 2 Round 4

Division 2 Round 5

Division 2 Round 6

Division 2 Round 7

Division 2 Final

Division 3

Division 3 table

Division 3 Rounds 1 to 7

Division 3 Round 1

Division 3 Round 2

Division 3 Round 3

Division 3 Round 4

Division 3 Round 5

Division 3 Round 6

Division 3 Round 7

Division 3 Final

Division 4

Division 4 table

Division 4 Rounds 1 to 7

Division 4 Round 1

Division 4 Round 2

Division 4 Round 3

Division 4 Round 4

Division 4 Round 5

Division 4 Round 6

Division 4 Round 7

Division 4 Final

League statistics
All scores correct as of 16 April 2019

Top scorer: Overall

Top scorer: Single game

Scoring events
Widest winning margin: 15
 Louth 5-16 – 0-16 Sligo (Division 3)
Most goals in a match: 7
Derry 3-21 – 4-16 Wexford (Division 4)
Most points in a match: 37
Derry 3-21 – 4-16 Wexford (Division 4)
Most goals by one team in a match: 5
Louth 5-16 – 0-16 Sligo (Division 3)
Wexford 0-12 – 5-04 Waterford (Division 4)
Most goals without winning: 4
Derry 3-21 – 4-16 Wexford (Division 4)
 Highest aggregate score: 58 points
Derry 3-21 – 4-16 Wexford (Division 4)
Lowest aggregate score: 14 points
Fermanagh 0-08 – 0-06 Kildare (Division 2)
Wicklow 0-08 – 0-06 London (Division 4)

References

External links
 Results Archive – Hoganstand.com

 
National Football League
National Football League (Ireland) seasons